Pre-Finno-Ugric substrate refers to substratum loanwords from unidentified non-Indo-European and non-Uralic languages that are found in various Finno-Ugric languages, most notably Sami. The presence of Pre-Finno-Ugric substrate in Sami languages was demonstrated by Ante Aikio.  points out that similar substrate words are present in Finnic languages as well, but in much smaller numbers.

The number of substrate words in Sámi likely exceeds one thousand words.

Borrowing to Saami from Paleo-Laplandic probably still took place after the completion of the Great Saami Vowel Shift. Paleo-Laplandic likely became extinct about 1500 years ago.

The Nganasan language also has many substrate words from unknown extinct languages in the Taimyr peninsula.

Theories 

According to Aikio, the speakers of the Proto-Samic language arrived in Lapland around 650 BC and fully assimilated the local Paleo-European populations by the middle of 1st millennium AD. In his opinion, the detailed reconstruction of these languages is impossible.

The languages of more eastern post-Swiderian cultures might have influenced Finno-Ugric languages as well. According to Peter Schrijver, some of these substrate languages probably had many geminated consonants. A lexical comparison with the hypothetical Pre-Germanic substratum yields no results.

Some examples of Kildin Sami words and corresponding Northern Sami cognates without convincing Uralic/Finno-Ugric (or any other) etymologies:

Most of these words have cognates in all Sami languages. A more extensive list of such words can be found in G. M. Kert's 2009 work on Sami toponymics. Semantically, pre-Sami substrate consists mostly of basic vocabulary terms (i.e. human body parts) and nature/animal names, and lacks terms of kinship and societal organization, which suggests a rather low level of socioeconomic development in pre-Sami cultures.

Some possible substrate words can also be found in Finnish.

Pre-Finno-Volgaic substrate 
There are also some examples of possible substrate words in Finno-Volgaic languages that differ from the Pre-Sami substrate, i.e. Proto-Finno-Volgaic *täštä "star", or *kümmin "ten".

Some words in Finno-Volgaic languages contain rare consonant clusters, which suggests loanwords from unknown languages.

Finnish words such as jauho (Eng. flour), lehmä (cow), tähti (star), tammi (oak) and ihminen (human) could be substrate words.

Aikio (2021) lists some other substrate vocabulary as:

Irregular correspondences among Uralic languages are frequent among some words, such as 'to milk' and 'hazelnut'. These are presumed to be non-native loanwords by Aikio (2021):

Toponyms 
Some toponyms in Finland appear to be of non-Uralic origin; for example, a word "koita" regularly appears in hydronyms for long and narrow bodies of water and is thus probably the continuation of the native word for "long, narrow".

Many other toponyms in Finland seem to come from a substrate language or from many substrate languages: among these are Saimaa, Imatra, Päijänne and Inari.

There are also toponyms from a substrate language in Sápmi; for example, an ending -ir (< *-ērē) is commonly found in names of mountains and is probably the continuation of the substrate word for mountain.

Other such toponymic words are  'watershed', *čār- 'uppermost (lake)', *- 'isolated mountain', - 'mountain top on the edge of a mountain area', *sāl- 'large island in the sea', - 'seashore cliff', and *inč- 'outermost island'.

Languages 
Because there are irregularities in Sami substrate words, they might have been borrowed from distinct, but related languages. In the west, the substrate languages probably had an s-type sibilant which corresponds to an š-type sibilant in the east.

Because we only have fragments of Lakelandic Sami which were preserved in Finnish placenames and dialectal vocabulary, the features of the Paleo-Lakelandic substrate in Lakelandic Sami cannot be studied. Many placenames in Finland come from Sami words of unknown origin which are likely substrate words, such as jokuu from Proto-Sami *čuokōs ‘track, way’.

The Sami substrate in Finnish dialects also reveals that Lakelandic Sami languages had a high number of words with an obscure origin, likely deriving from old languages of the region.

See also 
 List of Proto-Samic terms derived from substrate languages
 List of Proto-Samic terms with unknown etymologies
 Paleo-European languages
 Germanic substrate hypothesis
 Goidelic substrate hypothesis
 Old European hydronymy
Comb Ceramic culture

References 

Pre-Indo-Europeans
Languages extinct in the 1st millennium
Unclassified languages of Europe
Uralic languages
Linguistic strata